Luritia "Rue" Winterbotham Carpenter (1876–1931), was an American art collector and philanthropist, who co-founded the Arts Club of Chicago.

Early life
She was born Rue Winterbotham, the daughter of Joseph Humphrey Winterbotham (1852–1925), a Chicago manufacturer, bank director, Chicago Art Institute benefactor and Michigan state senator, and his wife Genevieve Winterbotham, née Baldwin (1853–1906).

Career
Carpenter was a designer and an interior decorator. 
Carpenter was one of the founders of the Arts Club of Chicago in 1916 and was its president from 1918 until her death in 1931. Her niece Rue Winterbotham Shaw became president in 1940.

Personal life
In 1901, Carpenter married the composer John Alden Carpenter. They had one daughter Genevieve Baldwin Carpenter, later Genevieve Carpenter Hill.

In 1929, they lived at 942 Lake Shore Drive, Chicago.

On December 7, 1931, Carpenter died in Chicago, Illinois. She was 55 years old.

Legacy 
Carpenter is buried at Grand View Cemetery in Charlotte, Vermont.

Carpenter's 1920 portrait, which was painted by Arthur Ambrose McEvoy, is held in the Art Institute of Chicago. It was gifted to them by Genevieve Carpenter Hill.

References

1876 births
1931 deaths
American art collectors
20th-century American philanthropists
People from Chicago
American women philanthropists
Philanthropists from Illinois
20th-century women philanthropists